Hlabisa is a settlement in Umkhanyakude District Municipality in the KwaZulu-Natal province of South Africa. The village lies between the Hluhluwe and Umfolozi game reserves, some 40 km north-west of Mtubatuba. Named after the Hlabisa tribe of Zulus.

Neighbouring localities include Somkele (37 km); Nongoma (40 km); Kwamsane (43 km); Mtubatuba (47 km); Hluhluwe (48 km); Mahlabatini (50 km).

In 2007, researchers studied local healthcare habits and how long it took people in Hlabisa sub-district to go to a hospital after they had been bitten by a snake.

Notable people

 Beauty Ngxongo (born 1953), is a master weaver of Zulu baskets; she lives in Hlabisa.
 DJ Tira (born 1976; also known as Mthokozisi Khathi), DJ and producer; his birthplace and early childhood home is Hlabisa.
 Misuzulu Zulu (born 1974), he is the King of the Zulus and was born in Hlabisa.

References

Populated places in the Big Five Hlabisa Local Municipality